Sinningia  is a genus of flowering plants in the family Gesneriaceae. It is named after Wilhelm Sinning (1792–1874), a gardener of the Botanische Gärten der Friedrich-Wilhelms-Universität Bonn. There are about 65 species of tuberous herbaceous perennials, all occurring in Central and South America, with the greatest concentration of species occurring in southern Brazil.

The best-known species, Sinningia speciosa, was originally introduced in cultivation as Gloxinia speciosa and is still commonly known to gardeners and in the horticultural trade as "gloxinia", although this is now considered incorrect. The true genus Gloxinia is distinguished by having scaly rhizomes rather than tubers.

Sinningia species often grow on rocks or cliffs and most are pollinated by hummingbirds or bees but Sinningia brasiliensis is bat-pollinated, and Sinningia tubiflora, with large, powerfully fragrant tubular white flowers, is apparently pollinated by sphinx moths. Most of the species have large, brightly colored flowers. Because of this, numerous species and numerous hybrids and cultivars are grown as houseplants. A cultivar worth knowing is Sinningia x 'Lovely.' This beautifully gentle plant is a cross between Sinningia sellovii and Sinningia tubiflora. Its tall spikes and tubular flowers attract butterflies, and delight gardeners.  Some species with particularly large tubers are cultivated by cactus and succulent enthusiasts as caudiciforms. One such example is Sinningia leucotricha, often listed under the older name Rechsteineria leucotricha and dubbed "Brazilian edelweiss" for its covering of silvery, silky hairs. Other species with large tubers are Sinningia iarae, Sinningia lineata, and Sinningia macropoda.

The Brazilian genera Paliavana and Vanhouttea, consisting of shrubby plants without tubers, are closely related to Sinningia and recent morphological and molecular analyses (Boggan 1991, Perret et al. 2003) suggest that these genera are, in fact, nontuberous Sinningia species. All three genera were included in tribe Gloxinieae in the classification system of Hans Wiehler but are now recognized in their own tribe, Sinningieae.

Numerous genera, including Corytholoma, Rechsteineria and Lietzia, have been synonymized under Sinningia.

Garden uses and cultivation
Sinningias are attractive greenhouse plants and houseplants that appeal strongly to gardeners who like to specialize in particular plant groups. The chief environmental needs are warmth, high humidity, suitable soil and good light with shade from strong sun. The soil should be well drained. It should contain a liberal proportion of organic matter, such as leaf mold or peat moss, and enough coarse sand or perlite to ensure good porosity.

The hybrid cultivars 'Empress Purple Spotted' and 'Empress Red' have gained the Royal Horticultural Society's Award of Garden Merit.

Species
Species include:

Sinningia aggregata (Ker Gawl.) Wiehler
Sinningia aghensis Chautems
Sinningia amambayensis Chautems
Sinningia araneosa Chautems, 1997
Sinningia barbata (Nees & Mart.) G. Nicholson
Sinningia brasiliensis (Regel & E. Schmidt) Wiehler
Sinningia bulbosa (Ker Gawl.) Wiehler
Sinningia bullata Chautems et al., 2010
Sinningia canastrensis Chautems et al., 2010
Sinningia canescens (Mart.) Wiehler
Sinningia cardinalis (Lehm.) H.E.Moore
Sinningia carolinae (Wawra) Benth. & Hook. f. ex Siebert & Voss
Sinningia cochlearis (Hook.) Chautems
Sinningia concinna (Hook. f.) G. Nicholson
Sinningia cooperi (J. Paxton) Wiehler
Sinningia discolor (Decne. ex Hanst.) Sprague
Sinningia douglasii (Lindl.) Chautems
Sinningia elatior (Kunth) Chautems
Sinningia eumorpha H.E. Moore
Sinningia gerdtiana Chautems et al., 2010
Sinningia gesneriifolia (Hanst.) Clayberg
Sinningia gigantifolia Chautems
Sinningia glazioviana (Fritsch) Chautems
Sinningia globulosa Chautems et al., 2010
Sinningia guttata Lindl.
Sinningia harleyi Chautems
Sinningia hatschbachii Chautems
Sinningia helioana Chautems et al., 2010
Sinningia helleri Nees
Sinningia hirsuta (Lindl.) G.Nicholson
Sinningia iarae Chautems
Sinningia incarnata (Aubl.) D.L.Denham
Sinningia insularis (Hoehne) Chautems
Sinningia kautskyi Chautems
Sinningia leopoldii (Scheidw. ex Planch.) Chautems
Sinningia leucotricha (Hoehne) H.E.Moore
Sinningia lindleyi Schauer
Sinningia lineata (Hjelmq.) Chautems
Sinningia macrophylla (Nees & Mart.) Benth. & Hook.f. ex Fritsch
Sinningia macrostachya (Lindl.) Chautems
Sinningia magnifica (Otto & A. Dietr.) Wiehler
Sinningia maximiliana (Hanst.) Benth. & Hook. ex Fritsch
Sinningia micans (Fritsch) Chautems
Sinningia muscicola Chautems et al., 2010
Sinningia nivalis Chautems
Sinningia nordestina Chautems, Baracho & J.A.Siqueira
Sinningia × ornata (Van Houtte) H.E. Moore
Sinningia piresiana (Hoehne) Chautems
Sinningia polyantha (DC.) Wiehler
Sinningia pusilla (Mart.) Baill.
Sinningia reitzii (Hoehne) L.E. Skog
Sinningia richii Clayberg
Sinningia rupicola (Mart.) Wiehler
Sinningia sceptrum (Mart.) Wiehler
Sinningia schiffneri Fritsch
Sinningia sellovii (Mart.) Wiehler
Sinningia speciosa (Lodd.) Hiern
Sinningia striata (Fritsch) Chautems
Sinningia tribracteata (Otto & A. Dietr.) Wiehler
Sinningia tuberosa (Mart.) H.E. Moore
Sinningia valsuganensis Chautems
Sinningia verticillata (Vell.) H.E. Moore
Sinningia villosa Lindl.
Sinningia warmingii (Hiern) Chautems

References

 Boggan, J.K. 1991. 1991. A morphological study and cladistic analysis of Sinningia and associated genera with particular reference to Lembocarpus, Lietzia, Paliavana, and Vanhouttea (Gesneriaceae: Gloxinieae). Thesis, Cornell University, Ithaca, New York, U.S.A. ix + 179 pages, 21 figures. [Copies available at Cornell University and Smithsonian Institution libraries.]
 Perret, M., A. Chautems, R. Spichiger, G. Kite, & V. Savolainen. 2003. Systematics and evolution of tribe Sinningieae (Gesneriaceae): evidence from phylogenetic analyses of six plastid DNA regions and nuclear ncpGS. American Journal of Botany 90(3): 445-460. 
 Wiehler, H. 1983.  A synopsis of the neotropical Gesneriaceae. Selbyana 6: 1-219.
 Wiehler, H. and A. Chautems. 1995. A reduction of Lietzia to Sinningia. Gesneriana 1(1): 5-7.

External links

 The Genera of Gesneriaceae
 Sinningia from the Gesneriad Reference Web
 Sinningia & Friends
 Gesneriaceae in: Brazilian Flora Checklist

 
Gesneriaceae genera